A medical journal is a peer-reviewed scientific journal that communicates medical information to physicians, other health professionals. Journals that cover many medical specialties are sometimes called general medical journals.

History
The first medical journals were general medical journals, and were established in the late 18th century; specialty-specific medical journals were first introduced in the early 20th century. The first medical journal to be published in the United Kingdom was  Medical Essays and Observations, established in 1731 and published in Edinburgh; the first to be published in the United States was The Medical Repository, established in 1797.

Criticisms
Richard Smith, the former editor of the medical journal the BMJ, has been critical of many of the aspects of modern-day medical journal publishing. Critics of medical publishing have argued that problems related to gaming of citation and authorship are prevalent in the field, as many authors did not actually contribute to the articles that their names are on, many contributors to the articles are excluded from authorship, and strategic and unnecessary citations are prevalent to boost scores.

See also
List of medical journals
 Academic journal

References

 Medical journal
Medical literature